Shelburne—Yarmouth was a federal electoral district in Nova Scotia, Canada, that was represented in the House of Commons of Canada from 1925 to 1935.

This riding was created in 1924 from Shelburne and Queen's and Yarmouth and Clare ridings. It consisted of the Counties of Shelburne and Yarmouth. It was abolished in 1933 when it was merged into Shelburne—Yarmouth—Clare.

Members of Parliament

This riding elected the following Members of Parliament:

Election results

By-election: On Mr. Hatfield being called to the Senate, 6 October 1926

See also 

 List of Canadian federal electoral districts
 Past Canadian electoral districts

External links 
 Riding history for Shelburne—Yarmouth (1924–1933) from the Library of Parliament

Former federal electoral districts of Nova Scotia